Henry Thomas Lane (17 May 1793 – 15 February 1834) was an English amateur cricketer who played during the early 19th century.

Lane was born at Marylebone in Middlesex in 1793, the son of Thomas and Mary Lane. He lived at Hurstpierpoint in Sussex and was educated at Eton College and Christ Church, Oxford, matriculating in 1811. Lane was a member of MCC but played mainly for West Kent. He appeared in nine first-class cricket matches between 1817 and 1827, playing for MCC as well as early Kent and Hampshire sides and played twice for the Gentlemen against the Players. He "failed to make any impression on the field" but was President of MCC in 1824/25 and has been described as "a well-liked character".

Lane lived at Middleton House at Westmeston near Lewes in Sussex. Part of the house was designed by George Stanley Repton in 1828. Lane married Jane Lambert in 1831. He died at Middleton in 1834 of apoplexy at the age of 40.

References

External links

1793 births
1834 deaths
English cricketers
English cricketers of 1787 to 1825
English cricketers of 1826 to 1863
Hampshire cricketers
Marylebone Cricket Club cricketers
Kent cricketers
Gentlemen cricketers
E. H. Budd's XI cricketers